Four States is an unincorporated community in Marion County, West Virginia, United States. Four States is located along a railroad line northwest of Worthington. Four States has a post office with ZIP code 26572.

The community was named for the fact the proprietor owned mines in four U.S. states.

References

Unincorporated communities in Marion County, West Virginia
Unincorporated communities in West Virginia
Coal towns in West Virginia